KXNO (1460 kHz) is a commercial AM radio station in Des Moines, Iowa.  KXNO is owned by iHeartMedia, and airs a sports radio format.  KXNO's studios are located in Des Moines, while its 3-tower transmitter array is located on Northeast Broadway Avenue near Capitol Heights.

KXNO is simulcast on 25,000 watt sister station 106.3 KXNO-FM in Ankeny, Iowa.

Programming

KXNO competes with 1700 KBGG "The Champ", a CBS Sports Radio affiliate, and AM 1350 KRNT, known as ESPN Radio 1350 Des Moines.

Weekday mornings and afternoons feature local sports shows.  In middays, syndicated shows from Dan Patrick and Colin Cowherd are heard.  Nights and weekends, the station carries programming from the Fox Sports Radio Network.   KXNO serves as the flagship station of the Iowa Wild in the American Hockey League (AHL).  It broadcasts St. Louis Cardinals baseball games and Minnesota Vikings NFL games.  It also carries Iowa State University women's basketball and coaches' shows.

History

The station was first licensed on July 29, 1922, as WKAA in Cedar Rapids, Iowa, to the Republican Times and H. F. Parr, for operation on the "entertainment" wavelength of 360 meters (833 kHz). The call sign was randomly assigned from a sequential roster of available call letters. (Initially call letters beginning with "W" were generally assigned to stations east of an irregular line formed by the western state borders from North Dakota south to Texas, with calls beginning with "K" going only to stations in states west of that line. In January 1923 the Mississippi River was established as the new boundary, thus after this date Iowa stations generally received call letters starting with "K" instead of "W".) Later that year, ownership was changed to just H. F. Parr, and the station was authorized to also transmit on the 485 meter (619 kHz) "market and weather" wavelength.

In 1923 WKAA was reassigned to 1120 kHz,  which was changed to 1080 kHz in 1924. In late 1925 the call letters were changed to KWCR ("Keep Watching Cedar Rapids"). KWCR made several additional frequency changes during the station's early years, eventually moving to 1430 kHz.

On March 17, 1935, the KSO call letters were transferred from the original station on 1320 kHz to the now-former KWCR on 1430 kHz, which was also relocated from Cedar Rapids to Des Moines. This same day the call letters of the original KSO on 1320 kHz were changed to KRNT. At that time, both stations were owned and operated by subsidiary corporations of the Des Moines Register-Tribune. This new KSO became an NBC Blue Network affiliate, carrying its schedule of dramas, comedies, news, sports, soap operas, game shows and big band broadcasts during the "Golden Age of Radio.  At that time, the station broadcast with 250 watts daytime and 100 watts at night and had its studios in the newspaper's building.

KSO changed frequencies one last time as part of the North American Regional Broadcasting Agreement of 1941, moving from 1430 to 1460 AM.  KSO and KRNT were both owned by the Cowles family until 1944, when they sold KSO after the FCC ruled that one company could not own two radio stations in the same market.

KSO had a successful country music format from 1974 until 1989.  On September 1, KSO began simulcasting KGGO-FM's album rock format, taking on the KGGO call sign in the process.

In 1994, the station became KDMI, broadcasting religious and Spanish language programming. Clear Channel Communications (now iHeartMedia) acquired KDMI in 2000. On January 1, 2001, KDMI became KXNO and adopted its current sports radio format. KXNO had two direct competitors: AM 940 KXTK (now KPSZ, 940 AM) and FM 107.1 KJJC (now KNWI).  Both stations changed formats by mid-2003. 

In 2008, KXNO was nominated for a Marconi Award as the "Sports Station of the Year," given annually by the National Association of Broadcasters.

On January 14, 2020, KXNO laid off its programming director, a producer, and four on-air personalities as part of a larger wave of layoffs by iHeartMedia due to a corporate restructuring. The layoffs included its morning hosts Travis Justice and Heather Burnside, and afternoon drive hosts Chris Williams and Ross Peterson. The layoffs were met with a negative response: in solidarity with their colleagues, fellow KXNO hosts Andy Fales and Keith Murphy protested the layoffs by cancelling their show for the day, and encouraged local sponsors to threaten boycotts of the station. Fales told Rolling Stone that the threat of the station's programming of local interest being replaced by nationally-syndicated personalities, with no adequate alternative available, was a disservice to the region's "passionate sports fans". The layoffs also generated criticism from listeners via social media.

On January 16, 2020, the station's general manager Joel McCrea announced that iHeartMedia had given him permission to reinstate the employees. In addition, it was announced that KDXA would drop its alternative rock format and become an FM simulcast of KXNO.

Larry Cotlar and Marty Tirrell feud
During 2008 and 2009, a feud brewed between morning show host Larry Cotlar and afternoon drive host Marty Tirrell. Tirrell and his radio partner, Ken Miller, had been critical of Cotlar's perceived bias towards the Drake University Bulldogs. They were also critical of Cotlar's interview style of "lobbing softball questions" to his guests.

On March 20, 2009, things boiled over in the KXNO studios as Tirrell initiated a verbal tirade, using harsh words that was heard briefly on the air.  They included the "F" word a dozen times, mostly by Tirrell, who at times seemed to be on the verge of a breakdown. The two were suspended for a week as a result, with The Dan Patrick Show temporarily taking its time slot.

On March 25, both hosts, as well as the board operator, Geoff Conn, were fired from their positions.  FCC complaint reports were filed March 25 from an anonymous source.  Tirell's weekly sports commentary for CBS affiliate Channel 8 KCCI, Mouth of the Midwest, was also cancelled. Cotlar later apologized to Clear Channel to and the station's listeners for the incident.

Cotlar's morning slot was filled by Jon Miller, the sports director of sister station WHO, and Steve Deace, who hosted an afternoon talk show on WHO and previously hosted an afternoon show on KXNO.

On April 20, a new show hosted by WHO-TV personalities Keith Murphy and Andy Fales debuted in the 2-4 p.m. time slot. Tirrell and Cotlar later joined rival station KBGG.

References

External links
KXNO's website   
KSO historical artifacts from DesMoinesBroadcasting.com   
   
FCC History Cards for KXNO (covering 1927-1979 as KWCR/KSO)

XNO
Radio stations established in 1922
Radio stations licensed before 1923 and still broadcasting
1922 establishments in Iowa
IHeartMedia radio stations
Sports radio stations in the United States
Fox Sports Radio stations